Novy Tikhonov is a rural locality (a khutor) and the administrative center of Novotikhonovskoye Rural Settlement, Staropoltavsky District, Volgograd Oblast, Russia. The population was 354 as of 2010. There are 11 streets.

Geography 
Novy Tikhonov is located in steppe, 44 km south of Staraya Poltavka (the district's administrative centre) by road. Posevnoy is the nearest rural locality.

References 

Rural localities in Staropoltavsky District